"A Regular Epic Final Battle" is the series finale of the American animated television series Regular Show. It aired on Cartoon Network on January 16, 2017. All parts are 11 minutes long.

The series revolves around the daily lives of two 23-year-old friends, Mordecai (a blue jay), and Rigby (a raccoon). They work as groundskeepers at a park, and spend their days trying to slack off and entertain themselves by any means. This is much to the chagrin of their boss Benson (a gumball machine) and their coworker Skips (a yeti), but to the delight of park manager Pops (a man with a lollipop-shaped head). Their other coworkers, Muscle Man (an overweight green man) and Hi-Five Ghost (a ghost with a hand extending from the top of his head) serve as their rivals.

1.33 million viewers watched Part 1 and 1.37 million viewers watched Parts 2 and 3, making it the most viewed episode of the eighth season.

Plot

Part 1
Pops has a nightmare about his upcoming fight with his brother Anti-Pops, and Mordecai and Rigby comfort him. A short time later, the park crew arrives at Lolliland. They meet a group of Lolliland natives: Frivola-Kranus, Quadravi-Kranus, and Weird Mushroom Guy. The natives explain that Pops is the perfect creation of their planet called Mega-Kranus and Anti-Pops was created as his opposite to maintain balance in the universe called Malum-Kranus, respectively. The natives show the park crew ancient tapestries of the previous battles between Pops and Anti-Pops, which detail prior incarnations of the park crew fighting alongside Pops. Knowing that all the prior battles have ended in a stalemate (resulting in the universe resetting), Mordecai comes up with setting traps for Anti-Pops to give Pops an upper hand, which he didn't have in previous battles. Pops reluctantly agrees to do so. After Anti-Pops and his bounty hunters arrive in an Uber-like taxi following the destruction of most of the former's ship, Pops tries to convince him not to fight because they are brothers. Anti-Pops refuses and attacks Pops but is caught in the traps laid by the park crew. The victory is short-lived, however, as Anti-Pops quickly escapes the traps.

Part 2
To ensure his friends' survival, Pops makes a deal with Anti-Pops: whoever lands the first blow in battle gets to decide the fate of the universe. Pops successfully injures Anti-Pops, but Anti-Pops breaks the agreement and continues the fight. Streaming, who still has his sights on destroying the Disc Masters, suddenly arrives with his Stream Box Bot minions and aids Anti-Pops in the battle. Meanwhile, the park crew, HD DVD, Blu-ray, the Baby Ducks, Toothpick Sally, Recap Robot, Chance Sureshot (whose prior "death" in "Space Escape" is revealed to be that of a clone), the Guardians of Eternal Youth, Gary, Carter and Briggs, Death, Party Horse 42699, and the Guardian of Lolliland (who is supposed to remain neutral) fight against Anti-Pops's minions, Streaming, and the Stream Box Bots (who merge with their master to power him up) and manage to defeat them. However, Anti-Pops assumes his titan form and begins erasing Lolliland. The erasing of Muscle Man and Hi Five Ghost causes Pops to assume his titan form as well. Anti-Pops proceeds to erase the rest of Pops' allies and friends except Mordecai and Rigby, and kick his brother into a portal. Mordecai and Rigby realize that the only way to stop time from resetting is to get in between them while they are about to punch each other. As the two brothers' punches collide (with Mordecai and Rigby between their knuckles), it obliterates the entire universe and resets time.

Part 3 ("The Power")
Part 3 begins precisely like the first episode of Season 1, "The Power," seemingly "resetting" time back to the series' beginning. However, Rigby quickly remembers the events of the prior episodes and the rest of the series. However, Mordecai does not remember, so Rigby shows him the stash of buried Blu-rays (from the previous episode "Cheer Up Pops"), which triggers his memories of the series' events after touching it. Realizing that time didn't correctly reset, they use the Power to take them to the future and back to the battle between Pops and Anti-Pops. Anti-Pops attacks them, destroying the Power in the process. As Pops continues to fight, it becomes clear that fighting Anti-Pops will inevitably lead to another stalemate, which he realizes through flashbacks to the first two parts of the episode and "Kill 'Em with Kindness." Pops grabs Anti-Pops and flies toward the sun, telepathically comforting Mordecai and Rigby. Anti-Pops reconciles with his brother, and the two are finally at peace before they fly into the sun. With the resetting cycle broken, the effects of Anti-Pops' erasing are reversed, and the erased workers and allies are revived. After three years in space, the park workers fly back to Earth, where they reunite with their friends and families and are welcomed as heroes.

The park workers and Mr. Maellard erect a memorial statue in honor of Pops and mourn him. After six years of working at the park, Mordecai and Rigby quit their jobs and move on with their lives. Mordecai becomes a successful artist, marries a bat named Stef, and has three children with her. Rigby and Eileen get married and raise two daughters. Muscle Man and Starla move into a better trailer in the park and have many children, who adopt many of his mannerisms (like taking off their shirts and yelling). High-Five Ghost and his girlfriend, Celia, become party DJs touring in Prague and later have a son. Benson, who has now become the park owner after Mr. Maellard passes away, reunites with and marries his girlfriend, Pam (who becomes co-manager alongside her husband), and the two adopt five cats along with Applesauce, Benson's pig. Skips continues happily working in the park, but ditches his trademark jeans for jean shorts. At their 25th anniversary reunion, the park crew raises a statue of Mr. Maellard next to the one of Pops and take a picture in front of it with their families. As the reunion party commences, Mordecai and Rigby (now 54-years-old) reminisce on Pops' sacrifice and how none of them would have been able to lead such beautiful lives without him. They decide to play some old arcade games in the shed before saying their catchphrases and laughing about how immature they used to be. It is then revealed that Pops is watching his friends in what seems to be an afterlife (presumably Heaven) on a VHS tape labeled "Regular Show." He ejects the video and says "Jolly good show".

Broadcast
The episode premiered on Cartoon Network on January 16, 2017, at 6:00pm ET/PT. It was viewed by 1.33 million viewers in part one and 1.37 million viewers each in parts two and three, making it the most-watched episode of the eighth season.

Reception
Eric Thurm of the AV Club praised the finale, stating that the finale was "a fight that cyclically bookends the destruction and rebirth of the Regular Show universe. Thurm also praised the finale for the future lives of the characters who have their own brief sendoff, and describes Regular Show itself as two things: "a frequently surreal, borderline adult show on a network primarily for children", and "a product of ’80s nostalgia that preceded a boom in similar, less inventive shows, and found much of what was fun in that era’s pop culture."

Lorinda Marrian of Screenrant places all three parts of the finale at the top of the "15 Best Episodes Of Regular Show, According To IMDb", claiming that the first part was the perfect start to the finale and that the last part, in his own words, "was an action-packed and heartfelt sendoff to one of Cartoon Network's best shows."

Cultural references
"Heroes" by David Bowie is played during the montage at the end of the third part.

During the fight scene between Pops and Anti-Pops towards the end of the second part, lots of fourth wall breaks start happening, one of which being Pops interacting with himself from the Regular Show pilot short "The Naive Man from Lolliland."

References

External links

 

Regular Show episodes
2017 American television episodes
2010s American television specials
American television series finales
Metafictional television episodes
Older versions of cartoon characters
Television episodes about death
Television episodes about time travel
Television episodes set in outer space